Trimetaphan camsilate (INN) or trimethaphan camsylate (USAN), trade name Arfonad, is a drug that counteracts cholinergic transmission at the ganglion type of nicotinic receptors of the autonomic ganglia and therefore blocks both the sympathetic nervous system and the parasympathetic nervous system.  It acts as a non-depolarizing competitive antagonist at the nicotinic acetylcholine receptor, is short-acting, and is given intravenously.

Effects
Trimetaphan is a sulfonium compound and therefore carries a positive charge.  Being charged, it cannot cross lipid cell membranes, such as those that comprise the blood–brain barrier.  Due to this, trimethaphan does not have any effect on the central nervous system.

The ciliary muscle of the eye functions to round the lens for accommodation and is controlled mainly by parasympathetic system input.  With administration of a ganglion-blocking drug, the ciliary muscle cannot contract (cycloplegia) and the patient loses the ability to focus their eyes.

Trimetaphan has a strong effect on the cardiovascular system.  The size of blood vessels is primarily controlled by the sympathetic nervous system.  Loss of sympathetic system input to the blood vessels causes them to get larger (vasodilation) which has the effect of lowering blood pressure.  Postural hypotension is a common side effect of such drugs. Trimethaphan causes a histamine release which further lowers blood pressure. Effects on the heart include a decreased force of contraction and an increase in heart rate (tachycardia). Reflexive tachycardia can be diminished or undetected because trimetaphan is also blocking the sympathetic ganglia innervating the heart. 

The motility of the gastrointestinal tract is regulated by the parasympathetic system, and blockage of this input results in diminished motility and constipation.

A rare side effect of trimethaphan administration is sudden respiratory arrest. The mechanism behind it is unknown, as trimethaphan does not appear to block neuromuscular transmission, and respiratory arrest is not an expected consequence of ganglionic blockage.

Therapeutic uses
The therapeutic uses of trimetaphan are very limited due to the competition from newer drugs that are more selective in their actions and effects produced.  It is occasionally used to treat a hypertensive crisis and dissecting aortic aneurysm, to treat pulmonary edema, and to reduce bleeding during neurosurgery.

References

Further reading 

 
 
 
 
 
 
 

Imidazolidinones
Nicotinic antagonists
Peripherally selective drugs
Sulfonium compounds
Ureas